Dragoslav Poleksić (Cyrillic: Драгослав Полексић; born 26 July 1970) is a Montenegrin retired footballer who played as a goalkeeper.

Club career
Poleksić was a member of Sutjeska Nikšić and Hajduk Kula, before moving abroad to Portugal in the summer of 1996. He spent the following six years in the country, representing Chaves, Campomaiorense and Espinho. Subsequently, Poleksić made a return to Serbia and Montenegro and joined Radnički Obrenovac in the 2003–04 season. He switched to Radnički Beograd the following season. Poleksić then spent two seasons with Mladenovac, before joining Inđija in the summer of 2007. He spent four years at the club, coming a way from the third tier to the top flight of Serbian football. During the 2010–11 season, Poleksić became the oldest player to make an appearance in the Serbian SuperLiga. He also spent two seasons at Hajduk Beograd, before retiring from active play.

Honours
Campomaiorense
 Taça de Portugal: Runner-up 1998–99

External links
 
 

1970 births
Living people
Footballers from Nikšić
Association football goalkeepers
Serbia and Montenegro footballers
Montenegrin footballers
FK Sutjeska Nikšić players
FK Hajduk Kula players
G.D. Chaves players
S.C. Campomaiorense players
S.C. Espinho players
FK Radnički Obrenovac players
FK Radnički Beograd players
OFK Mladenovac players
FK Inđija players
FK Hajduk Beograd players
First League of Serbia and Montenegro players
Primeira Liga players
Liga Portugal 2 players
Serbian SuperLiga players
Serbia and Montenegro expatriate footballers
Expatriate footballers in Portugal
Montenegrin expatriate sportspeople in Portugal